The term genocidal massacre was introduced by Leo Kuper (1908–1994) to describe incidents which have a genocidal component but are committed on a smaller scale when they are compared to genocides such as the Rwandan genocide. Others such as Robert Melson, who also makes a similar differentiation, class genocidal massacres as "partial genocide".

In his book Blood and Soil, Ben Kiernan states that imperial powers have often committed genocidal massacres to control difficult minorities within their empires. As an example he describes the actions of two Roman legions which were sent to Egypt in 68 AD in order to quell Jews who were rioting in Alexandria in support of Jews who were taking part in the First Jewish–Roman War. The Roman governor Tiberius Julius Alexander ordered two legions to massacre the inhabitants of the Jewish quarter, which was carried out to the letter, sparing none whatever their age or sex. The massacre ended after about 50,000 had been killed when Alexander, listening to the pleas of some yet to be killed, felt pity for them and ordered an end to the killings.

Kiernan makes the point that in his opinion, the killings, like genocide, do not have to be organized by the state. In support of his view, he describes several incidents:
 The massacre in the Cave of Frances of all the inhabitants of the Isle of Eigg by members of the Clan MacLeod on a raiding party from the Isle of Skye in 1577 and a retaliatory raid the next year when members of the Clan MacDonald burnt a MacLeod congregation to death in Trumpan Church, which was almost immediately followed by the Battle of the Spoiling Dyke.
 On 27 February 2002, an argument on a train of Hindu pilgrims (returning from Ayodhya) with vendors at the platform where it had stopped led to an accidental fire that killed 59 people (9 men, 25 women, 25 children). The next day, and for the following two days, riots in Gujarat caused 790 Muslim and 254 Hindu fatalities.

Kiernan states that some genocidal massacres are carried out against groups that are not covered by the Genocide Convention—such as being a member of a political party, or social class—but that these are covered under local laws and international treaties that criminalise crimes against humanity. However he does acknowledge that massacres against groups other than those in the Genocide Convention, and where the intention of the perpetrators did not specifically intend to commit genocide, are a grey area.

William Schabas makes the point that genocidal massacres are criminal offences under international law as a crime against humanity, and during an armed conflict under the laws of war. However he points out that international prosecutions for individual acts are not covered by the Rome Statute (which brought into existence the International Court of Justice) because crimes against humanity must be "widespread or systematic" and war crimes usually have to have a threshold above the individual crime "in particular when committed as part of a plan or policy or as part of a large-scale commission of such crimes".

Irving Louis Horowitz is critical of Kuper's approach. He cites Kuper's use of the term genocidal massacre to describe the inter-communal violence during the partition of India and during The Troubles in Northern Ireland. Hirsh states "to speak of [these] as genocidal in a context of religious competition and conflict risks diluting the notion of genocide and equating it with any conflict between national, religious, or racial groups".

Definitions 
This is a list of scholarly definitions of genocide massacre, a phrase coined by Leo Kuper.

See also
 Outline of Genocide studies

Notes

References

Further reading
 Bibliography of Genocide studies

Massacre
 Genocidal massacres